Ritson's Yorkshire Garland  , Edited and published by Joseph Ritson, is a reprinted edition of a book on Yorkshire music, first published in 1788.

Details 

 Yorkshire Garland  1809  (or to give it its full title - “The Yorkshire Garland; being a curious collection of old and new songs, concerning that famous county. [Edited by the Late Joseph Ritson, Esq.] ---- Part I. ----York: printed by N. Frobisher; and sold by J. Langdale, Northallerton  MDCCLXXXVIII Licensed and entered according to Order ----London: reprinted by R. Triphook, St.Jame's Street; By Harding and Wright, St. John's-square.       1809”) is a book of folk songs consisting of 32 pages with 6 works, published in 1788. A further edition (this edition) was reprinted in 1809

Other books in Ritson’s Garland series were Bishopric Garland, The Northumberland Garland, and The North-Country Chorister. A compilation of the whole series, entitled The Northern Garland was published in 1810.

The “Garland” series were important, not only an important document in their own right, but as one of the main sources of similar successor publications such as John Bell's Rhymes of Northern Bards and Bruce and Stokoe's Northumbrian Minstrelsy.

A set of original documents are held in The Robinson Library of Newcastle University

The publication 
The front cover of the book was as thus :-

THE<br/ >
YORKSHIRE GARLAND; <br/ >
BEING<br/ >
A CURIOUS COLLECTION<br/ >
OF<br/ >
OLD AND NEW<br/ >
SONGS, <br/ >
CONCERNING THAT FAMOUS COUNTY. <br/ >
[EDITED BY THE LATE<br/ >
JOSEPH RITSON, ESQ.] <br/ >
PART I. <br/ >
- - - - - - -<br/ >
YORK<br/ >
PRINTED BY N. FROBISHER; AND SOLD BY J. LANGDALE<br/ >
NORTHALLERTON<br/ >
MDCCLXXXVIII<br/ >
Licensed and entered according to Order<br/ >
- - - - - - -<br/ >
LONDON: <br/ >
REPRINTED BY R. TRIPHOOK, ST.JAME'S STREET; <br/ >
By Harding and Wright, St. John's-square. <br/ >
1809

Contents 
are as below :-<br/ >

See also 
Joseph Ritson
Ritson's Northern Garlands 1810<br/ >
Ritson's Bishopric Garland or Durham Minstrel 1792
Ritson's Northumberland Garland or Newcastle Nightingale 1809
Ritson's North-Country Chorister 1809

References

External links
 Allan’s Illustrated Edition of Tyneside songs and readings - page 512
 Google e-book Northern Garland
 Google e-book

English folk songs
Books by Joseph Ritson
Yorkshire folklore
Chapbooks